David Christopher Pringuer (born 1972), is a musician, record producer and sound engineer from London, England. He is a member of the band The Mighty Roars signed to (One Little Indian Records) and Bearhat. He regularly collaborates with David Turin and Kate Garner.

Education
He was educated at Abingdon School in Oxfordshire and SAE.

Production credits
The Mighty Roars: "Take a bite of peach", CD, 7", EP, 2005, Little Teddy Recordings, Germany
The Mighty Roars: "Swine and Cockerel", CD, LP, Album, 2007, One Little Indian Records
Hadar Manor: "Crossing London", CD, Album, 2009

Engineering / Mix Credits
A Complete History of My Sexual Failures - Upcoming European extras DVD
Bishi: "Nights At The Circus" CD, LP, Album 2007, Gryphon Records
Hadar Manor: "Crossing London" CD, Album, 2009 Sella Music

See also
 List of Old Abingdonians

References

English record producers
Living people
People educated at Abingdon School
1972 births